The Finnish Steam Locomotive Class C5 were ordered in 1880 by the Finnish State Railways  from the German Hanomag factory for the Tampere–Vaasa railway line. The locomotives were completed between 1881–1882 and received the Class designation C5. The C5 locomotives had inside cylinders, as in other C-series locomotives.  Originally it was planned that the locomotives be used for both freight and passenger duties. But passenger locomotives were considered unnecessary, because at that time the maximum speed of trains on the Tampere and Vaasa railway line was only .
C5 locomotives soon proved to be insufficiently powerful for the gradients of the Tampere and Vaasa railway line. C5 locomotives were moved to the flatter Seinäjoki–Oulu line, where they performed satisfactorily.

By the 1900s the C5 locomotives were transferred to shunting duties in the marshalling yards of various towns and cities around Finland.  They were agile and therefore suitable for shunting duties.  Because of the agility of the C5 locomotive it was nicknamed "Bliksti" or a “glimpse”. Today the Finnish Railway Museum has a class C5 on display.

Gallery

References

External links
Finnish Railway Museum
Steam Locomotives in Finland Including the Finnish Railway Museum

VR locomotives
C5
Railway locomotives introduced in 1882
Hanomag locomotives
0-6-0 locomotives
5 ft gauge locomotives